Natalie Wiegersma (born 7 January 1990, Hamilton) is a New Zealand swimmer who competes in the Women's 400m individual medley. At the 2012 Summer Olympics she finished 19th overall in the heats in the Women's 400 metre individual medley and failed to reach the final.  She also competed in the women's 200 metre individual medley, again, not progressing beyond the first round.

References

New Zealand female swimmers
1990 births
Living people
New Zealand people of Dutch descent
New Zealand people of Frisian descent
Olympic swimmers of New Zealand
Swimmers at the 2012 Summer Olympics
New Zealand female medley swimmers
Sportspeople from Hamilton, New Zealand
Swimmers at the 2010 Commonwealth Games
Commonwealth Games competitors for New Zealand